American Innovation dollars are dollar coins of a series minted by the United States Mint beginning in 2018 and scheduled to run through 2032. It is planned for each member of the series to showcase an innovation, innovator or group of innovators from a particular state or territory, while the obverse features the Statue of Liberty (Liberty Enlightening the World).

History
Legislation authorizing the American Innovation $1 Coin Program was approved by the United States Senate on June 20, 2018, amending an earlier House bill, and the Senate-amended bill was approved by the U.S. House of Representatives on June 27, 2018.  It was signed into law by President Donald Trump on July 18, 2018.
The program was officially launched on December 14, 2018, with the release of a special introductory coin commemorating George Washington's signing of the first American patent into law, for a new method of making potash and pearl ash. However, these coins are not being released into circulation, and are only available at a premium in bags and rolls directly from the United States Mint. Uncirculated issues bear either the "P" or "D" mint mark signifying its mintage at the Philadelphia Mint or Denver Mint respectively. Proof and reverse proof coins struck for collectors bear the "S" mint mark signifying its mintage at the San Francisco Mint.

Four new coins will be released each year "celebrating innovations and innovators" from each of the fifty states, the District of Columbia, and the five U.S. territories (Puerto Rico, Guam, American Samoa, the U.S. Virgin Islands, and the Northern Mariana Islands). All coins issued through this program will have the same obverse design showing the Statue of Liberty, and will contain the words: "In God We Trust" and "$1".

Coin designs
Coins will be issued depicting designs which symbolize "the willingness to explore, to discover, and to create one’s own destiny", according to the U.S. Mint's narrative. The program showcases an innovation, innovator or group of innovators from each State or territory in uncirculated and proof finishes. 

In 2019, a privy mark was added to the obverse of the coin under "In God We Trust".

See also 

50 State quarters
America the Beautiful silver bullion coins
District of Columbia and United States Territories quarters
America the Beautiful quarters
Presidential dollar coins
Westward Journey nickel series
Sacagawea dollar
United States Bicentennial coinage

References

External links 
 United States Mint, American Innovation $1 Coin Program

Currencies introduced in 2018
United States dollar coins
Circulating commemorative coins of the United States
Goddess of Liberty on coins
Statue of Liberty